Chiang Saen may refer to:

 Chiang Saen District, in Chiang Rai Province, northern Thailand
 Chiang Saen, a capital of the ancient Lanna kingdom, and namesake of the modern district